Hardy is French, English, Scottish and Irish surname.

It appears that the oldest usage is from the Old French hardi  meaning “bold, courageous" which itself comes from Old Frankish hardjan meaning "to make hard". The final -y is also typical of the French proper names (first names, surnames and place names, with the notable exception Henri, when it is a given name). 

Some of the oldest Hardy families in England seem to originate from a Norman Knight de Hardy in the mid 11th century. English Hardy families can mainly be found around Dorset and Yorkshire. 

In Scotland Hardi is considered to have Norman, Viking or Celtic origins and is mainly a Lowland surname. Scottish Hardy's are mainly affiliated with Clan Mackintosh as a sept and the larger Clan Chattan Federation.

Hardy could also be an anglicized form of the Irish Mac Giolla Deacair meaning "son of the hard lad". 

Notable persons with this surname include:

List of persons with the surname

A
Adolphe-Marie Hardy (1868–1954), Belgian poet and journalist
Adolphe-Maria Gustave Hardy (1920-2011), French bishop 
Aaron Hardy (born 1986), English footballer
Adrian Hardy (born 1970), American football player
Adrien Hardy (born 1978), French rower
Alexander M. Hardy, U.S. Representative from Indiana
Alexandre Hardy (c. 1570/1572–1632), French dramatist
Alfred Hardy (dermatologist) (1811–1893), French dermatologist
Alfred Hardy (architect) (1900–1965), Belgian contractor and autodidact architect
Alfred Douglas Hardy (1870–1958), Australian amateur collector of freshwater algae specimens
Alfredo Toro Hardy (born 1950), Venezuelan diplomat and author
Alfred Gathorne-Hardy, British politician
Alister Hardy, English marine biologist
Ange Hardy (born 1983), English singer
Anne Hardy, British artist
Annie Hardy, American singer-guitarist with Giant Drag
Anthony Hardy, English mental patient and murderer
Antonio Hardy, a.k.a. Big Daddy Kane, African-American rap artist
Arnold Hardy, American photographer
Arthur Charles Hardy, Canadian politician
Arthur Hardy (actor), British actor
Arthur Hardy (footballer), English footballer
Arthur Sherburne Hardy, American novelist and diplomat
Arthur Sturgis Hardy, Canadian politician

B
Barbara Hardy, Australian environmentalist and scientist
Barry Hardy, American wrestler
Bella Hardy, English folk musician, singer and songwriter
Benjamin Gower Hardy, Australian George Cross recipient
Ben Hardy, English Actor
Ben Hardy (motorcycle builder), American motorcycle builder 
Benjamin Hardy, Australian volleyball player
Bert Hardy, English photographer
Billy Hardy, English boxer
Billy Hardy (footballer), English footballer
Blaine Hardy, American baseball player
Bruce Hardy, American football player

C
"Hungry" Charles Hardy, American competitive eater
Carroll Hardy, American baseball player
Charles Hardy (Australian politician)
Charles Hardy (1714–1780), English naval officer
Charlie Hardy, Australian rules footballer
Chris Hardy, Canadian footballer
Cornelius Hardy, convict transported to Australia

D
D. Elmo Hardy (1914–2002), American entomologist
Dan Hardy (born 1982), English mixed martial arts fighter
Daniel Hardy (disambiguation), multiple people
Darrell Hardy, American basketball player
Darryl Hardy, American football player
David Hardy, principal cello of the United States National Symphony Orchestra, 1994 to the present.
David A. Hardy (born 1936), English artist
David T. Hardy, American author and jurist
Denis Hardy (economist), Québécois economist
Denis Hardy (politician) (1936–2016), Québécois politician
Don Hardy (1926–1998), English cricketer
Don Ed Hardy, American tattoo artist

E
Ed Hardy (American football) (born 1951), American football player
Edgar Richard "Hardy" Hardcastle (1900–1995), British economist
Edward W. Hardy (born 1992), American composer, violinist, and violist
Elias Hardy, English-born lawyer and politician in New Brunswick
Elora Hardy (born 1980), Canadian designer
Emmett Hardy (1903–1925), American jazz cornet player
Ernest George Hardy, classicist
Evan Hardy, English rugby union player

F
F. Digby Hardy (1868–1930), English fraudster and spy during the Irish War of Independence
Françoise Hardy (born 1944), French singer and actress
Frank Hardy (1917–1994), Australian novelist and activist
Frantz Hardy (born 1985), American-football player
Frederick Daniel Hardy (1827–1911), English painter
Friedhelm Hardy, (1943–2004), academic who specialized in Indian languages and religions

G
G. H. Hardy (1877–1947), English mathematician
Gathorne Hardy, 1st Earl of Cranbrook, English politician
 Gathorne-Hardy (disambiguation), multiple people
Gene Hardy, Canadian multi-instrumentalist and vocalist
George Hardy (labor leader), Canadian-American
Greg Hardy, American-football player
Guy U. Hardy, U.S. Representative from Colorado

H
Hagood Hardy (1937–1997), Canadian composer & pianist
Harry Hardy, English footballer
Harvey Hardy, American footballer
Henry Hardy, editor of the works of Isaiah Berlin
Heywood Hardy, English painter
Hugh W. Hardy U.S. Marines General

J
J. J. Hardy, American baseball player
Jack Hardy (catcher), baseball player
Jack Hardy, Canadian politician
Jack Hardy (singer-songwriter)
Jaden Hardy (born 2002), American basketball player
James D. Hardy, Jr., American academic and historian
James Greene Hardy (1795–1856), Kentucky politician and orator; Lt. Governor of Kentucky
James Hardy (American football) (born 1985)
James Hardy (basketball)
James Hardy (rower)
Janet Hardy, American erotic writer
Jean Hardy (1762–1802), French general of the French Revolution
Jeff Hardy, American wrestler
Jeff Hardy (rugby league), Australian rugby league player
Jeff Hardy (swimmer), Australian Paralympic swimmer
Jeremy Hardy (1961–2019), English comedian
Jermaine Hardy, American footballer
Jessica Hardy (born 1987), American swimmer
Jim Hardy (born 1923), American football quarterback
Jocelyn 'Joe' Hardy, professional ice hockey player
John Crumpton Hardy (20th century), President of the Mississippi Agricultural and Mechanical College
John Francis Gathorne-Hardy (1874–1949), British First World War General who served in Italy and the Western Front
John Gathorne-Hardy, 2nd Earl of Cranbrook (1839–1911), British peer and Conservative Member of Parliament
John Hardee, American jazz musician
John Hardy (composer), British composer
John Hardy (geneticist), British human geneticist and molecular biologist
John Hardy (jewelry) (born 1949), jewelry maker
John Hardy (MP for Bradford) (1773–1855), British MP and businessman and father of first Earl of Cranbrook
John Hardy (US politician) (1835–1913), U.S. Representative from New York
John Hardy, 1st Baronet (1809–1888), British Conservative Member of Parliament
John Spencer Hardy (1913–2012), American lieutenant general
Jonathan Hardy, New Zealand actor and screenwriter
Jonny Hardy, Israeli footballer
Joseph A. Hardy III, American businessman
Joseph Hardy, American stage director
Jules Hardy, Québécois doctor

K
K8 Hardy, performance artist
Karen Hardy, ballroom dancer
Kevin Hardy (defensive tackle)
Kevin Hardy (linebacker)

L
Larry Hardy (American football)
Larry Hardy (baseball)
Lawrence Hardy, English footballer
Leonard W. Hardy, Mormon pioneer
Leslie Hardy, American musician
Linda Hardy, French actress and model
Louise Hardy, Canadian politician
Lyndon Hardy, American science-fiction author
Lucien Hardy, theoretical physicist

M
Mabel Hardy (1890–1977), South Australian educator
María Cordero Hardy, Puerto Rican physiologist, educator and scientist
Marieke Hardy, Australian television writer
Mark A. Hardy, American surgeon
Mark Lea Hardy, Swiss hockey player
Mary Hardy (comedian), Australian television and radio presenter
Matt Hardy, American wrestler
Matthew P. Hardy, American reproductive biologist
Milton H. Hardy, American educator
Moses Hardy, American supercentenarian

N
Nelson Hardy, Australian Rugby League player
Nell Carter (1948–2003), born Nell Ruth Hardy, American singer and actress

O
Oliver Hardy (1892–1957), American comedy actor

P
Paul Hardy, American politician from Louisiana
Percy Hardy, English cricketer
Peter Hardy, Baron Hardy of Wath (1931–2003), English politician
Peter Hardy (actor), Australian Actor
Peter Hardy, Canadian brewer and baseball executive
Phil Hardy, British footballer
Phil Hardy, English film and music industry journalist
Phillip E. Hardy, American music critic
Porter Hardy Jr., U.S. representative from Virginia

R
Red Hardy (1923–2003), American baseball pitcher
René Hardy, member of the French Resistance
Richard Meredith-Hardy, British microlight pilot
Rob Hardy, film director
Robert Hardy (1925–2017), English actor
Robert Hardy, bassist with Franz Ferdinand
Robert Maynard Hardy, Anglican bishop
Robin Hardy (American writer), an American novelist
Robin Hardy (Canadian writer), a Canadian novelist and journalist
Robin Hardy (film director) (1929–2016), British film director
Roger Hardy, Canadian Internet entrepreneur 
Romain Hardy
Ron Hardy, American DJ
Ronald Hardy, English novelist
Rufus Hardy (representative) (1855–1943), member of the U.S. House of Representatives from Texas
Rufus K. Hardy (1878–1945), leader and missionary in The Church of Jesus Christ of Latter-day Saints

S
Sam Hardy (disambiguation)
Samuel Hardy, American lawyer and politician
Sarah Frances Hardy, American author and artist
Solomon Hardy, English cricketer
Stan Hardy, English footballer and manager

T
Temple Hardy, British naval officer
Terry Hardy, American-football player
Theodore Bayley Hardy, British Army chaplain
Thomas Duffus Hardy, English antiquary
Thomas Hardy (English painter)
Thomas Hardy (political reformer) (1752–1832)
Sir Thomas Hardy, 1st Baronet (1769–1839), British naval officer and Nelson's flag-captain at Trafalgar
Thomas Hardy (winemaker) (1830 – 1912), "Father of the South Australian Wine Industry"
Thomas Hardy (1840–1928), English novelist and poet
Thomas Lionel Hardy (1887–1969), English physician
Todd Hardy, Canadian politician
Tom Hardy (designer) (born 1946), American design strategist
Tom Hardy (born 1977), English stage, film and television actor
Trevor Hardy, convicted murderer

W
Warren Hardy, Nevada state senator
W. G. Hardy, Canadian professor, writer and ice hockey administrator
Wilfred Hardy, British artist and illustrator
William Bate Hardy, British biologist
William H. Hardy, American founder of Hattiesburg
William Le Hardy, English Archivist
Willie Hardy, American politician and activist

Fictional characters
Alec Hardy, character in the ITV television programme Broadchurch, played by David Tennant 
Andy Hardy, character in films, played by Mickey Rooney
Frank Hardy, character in the Hardy Boys novels
Gladys Hardy, character in The Ellen DeGeneres Show
Jemma Hardy, character in Ian Irvine's novel The Last Albatross
Joe Hardy, character in the Hardy Boys novels
Lewis Hardy, character in the ITV television programme The Bill
Ryan Hardy, character in The Following
Steiner Hardy, character from the anime Gundam 0080
Anti-heroes created by Marvel Comics :
Felicia Hardy (The Black Cat)
Felicity Hardy (The Scarlet Spider)
Walter Hardy or John Hardesky (The Cat)
On the ABC soap opera, General Hospital :
Audrey March Hardy
Simone Ravelle Hardy
Steve Hardy
Tommy Hardy
Tom Hardy
Tommy Hardy

See also
Hardee (surname)
Hardie
Sarah Blaffer Hrdy, American anthropologist and primatologist
Robert Barcia

References

English-language surnames
French-language surnames
Surnames from nicknames